Shutlingsloe is a hill near the village of Wildboarclough, in the east of the county of Cheshire. It stands to the south of Macclesfield Forest, on the edge of the Peak District and within the Peak District National Park.

A steep-sided hill with a distinctive profile, sometimes described as the 'Matterhorn of Cheshire', it is the third highest peak in the historic county (Black Hill being the highest and Shining Tor second highest) with an elevation of 506 m (1,660 ft) and commands excellent views over Cheshire. The Peak District Boundary Walk crosses the summit, which is the highest point on the footpath's 200-mile long route. 

The name derives from old English 'Scyttel's hlaw' meaning 'Scyttel's (personal name) hill' and is one of several 'low' names in the Peak District, from the same Old English root that gives rise to the name "Law" for many hills in southern Scotland.

Geology 

The hill is formed from alternating layers of mudstones and coarse sandstones (referred to as 'gritstones' or simply 'grits') which were laid down in a delta system in the Carboniferous period.  The summit tor is formed from the Chatsworth Grit and the lower slopes from the Roaches Grit. Several geological faults run northwest to southeast through the hill.

References

External links

 Shutlingsloe at Cressbrook
Discovercheshire website (Walk to Shutlingsloe)
A circular walk up Shutlingsloe

Mountains and hills of the Peak District
Hills of Cheshire